Walter Roy Smith (born May 18, 1976) is an American former Major League Baseball player.

External links

1976 births
Living people
Cleveland Indians players
Baseball players from St. Petersburg, Florida
Major League Baseball pitchers
Arizona League Mariners players
Wisconsin Timber Rattlers players
Memphis Chicks players
St. Paul Saints players
Kinston Indians players
Akron Aeros players
Buffalo Bisons (minor league) players
Sacramento River Cats players
Las Vegas 51s players